Chiu Chuang-chin ; born 12 July 1956) is a Taiwanese politician who served in the Legislative Yuan from 2002 to 2008.

Chiu studied architecture at Feng Chia University and completed graduate work at Dayeh University.

Prior to his election to the Legislative Yuan in 2001, Chiu served one term on the Changhua County Council. In May 2002, he accused local Chinese police of extorting visitors from Taiwan. Five months later, it was reported that his visitor's visa to Hong Kong was being delayed, along with the visas of other Democratic Progressive Party lawmakers. In 2003, Chiu softened his stance on China, supporting regulations regarding Taiwan's investment in the Chinese economy. Chiu was reelected to the legislature the in 2004. He lost to Lin Tsang-min in 2008.

References

1956 births
Living people
Changhua County Members of the Legislative Yuan
Members of the 5th Legislative Yuan
Members of the 6th Legislative Yuan
Democratic Progressive Party Members of the Legislative Yuan
Feng Chia University alumni